Selma Aliye Kavaf (born 1 July 1962) is a Turkish politician. She is the former Minister of State Responsible for Women and Family Affairs, and a member of parliament for Denizli of the ruling Justice and Development Party (AKP).

Early life and career 
Kavaf has graduated from the Turkology department of Ankara University Language, History and Geography Faculty.
She has worked as a teacher both in public and private schools for seven years.

Political career 
Kavaf entered politics in 2002 after the foundation of Justice and Development Party.
After the elections, Kavaf was promoted as the Founder General Presidency of Women's Branch of the Justice and Development Party. It is the first women organization of a Turkish political party in an institutional sense.

In the elections of 2007, Kavaf was elected as a member of parliament. She is the first female MP from Denizli. On 1 May 2009, she was appointed as State Minister Responsible for Women and Family in the second cabinet of Erdoğan. She has stated that she opposes homosexuality, in her own words: "I believe homosexuality is a biological disorder, a disease. It needs to be treated." Her remarks sparked controversy and were protested by anti-homophobia activists in Turkey.

Kavaf is one of the founding members of Ali Babacan's newly formed Democracy and Progress Party.

External links 
  Selma Aliye Kavaf – Official Website
  Biography of Selma Aliye Kavaf at AK Party

References

1962 births
Living people
Deputies of Denizli
Ankara University alumni
Justice and Development Party (Turkey) politicians
Democracy and Progress Party politicians
People from Denizli
Women government ministers of Turkey
Government ministers of Turkey
Members of the 23rd Parliament of Turkey
21st-century Turkish women politicians
21st-century Turkish politicians
Ministers of State of Turkey
Members of the 60th government of Turkey